Péter Boros (12 January 1908  16 October 1976) was a Hungarian gymnast. He competed in six events at the 1932 Summer Olympics, including two where he finished fifth, and the team all-around where he helped Hungary to a fourth-place finish.

References

1908 births
1976 deaths
Hungarian male artistic gymnasts
Gymnasts at the 1932 Summer Olympics
Olympic gymnasts of Hungary
20th-century Hungarian people